Mecodema manaia is a medium-sized ground beetle species found in the native forests of Bream Head and Mt Manaia, Northland, New Zealand. This species shares the forests of Bream Head with a large-bodied species, Mecodema tewhara, with both inhabiting slightly different forest type.

Diagnosis 
Distinguished from other North Island Mecodema species by having:

 the pronotal carina with 3–4 setae along each side (curvidens species group); 
 pronotum overall shape squared, midline poorly defined, medial impressions and microsculpture absent; 
 elytral interval 7 curved inwardly to parallel humeral angle; 
 ventrites 3 and 4 without setose punctures, ventrite 5 with 1 setose puncture each side of midline.

Description 
Length 24.5–28.7 mm, pronotal width 6.5–7.7 mm, elytral width 7.8–9.2 mm. Colour of entire body matte to glossy black.

Natural history 
Mecodema manaia is found in the native broadleaf forest, especially areas with deep leaf litter.

References

Beetles of New Zealand
manaia
Beetles described in 2011